Elijah Smith may refer to:

 Elijah F. Smith (1792–1879), mayor of Rochester, New York
 Elijah Smith (footballer) (1860–?), English footballer